Spider-Man: India is a superhero comic book series originally published in India by Gotham Entertainment Group in 2004, retelling the story of Marvel Comics' Spider-Man in an Indian setting. It ran for four issues, which were later also published in the United States in 2005 and collected into a trade paperback. The series was created by Sharad Devarajan, Suresh Seetharaman, and Jeevan J. Kang with Marvel Comics. The Indian version was conceptualized by Indian director Satyajit Ray, who had once met Stan Lee in New York to discuss creating an Indian version of the superhero. However, this was not done during Ray's lifetime.

The titular character of Pavitr Prabhakar / Spider-Man will make his cinematic debut in the 2023 feature film Spider-Man: Across the Spider-Verse voiced by Karan Soni, depicted as a member of Miguel O'Hara's Spider-Forces.

Plot summary
Pavitr Prabhakar, a simple Indian boy from a remote village, moves to Mumbai with his Aunt Maya and Uncle Bhim to study after getting half a scholarship. His parents died some years ago. Other students at his new school tease him and hit him for his studious nature and village background. He knows his Uncle Bhim is struggling to support him and his aunt Maya, and pay his school fees. Only Meera Jain, a popular girl from his school, befriends him. Meanwhile, a local crime lord named Nalin Oberoi uses an amulet to perform an ancient ritual in which he is possessed by a demon committed to opening a gate for other demons to invade Earth. While being chased by bullies, Pavitr Prabhakar encounters an ancient yogi who grants him the powers of a spider, in order to fight the evil that threatens the world. While discovering his powers, Pavitr Prabhakar refuses to help a woman being attacked by several men. He leaves the place, but comes back when he hears his uncle cry out, and discovers that he has been slain. He learns that Bhim was stabbed when he tried to help the woman. Pavitr Prabhakar understands that with great power comes great responsibility, and swears to use his powers for the good of others.

Nalin Oberoi briefly becomes human again and transforms a mild-mannered doctor into a demon with four magical tentacles (the Indian version of Doctor Octopus), and sends him to kill Spider-Man, as instructed by the demon voices. Doc Ock fails, and Spider-Man makes his public debut as a hero. He is, however, labeled a threat by the newspapers.

Oberoi kidnaps Pavitr Prabhakar's aunt, taking her to a refinery outside Mumbai. There he betrays Doctor Octopus, blasting him into the ocean with a ray. Spider-Man arrives and fights Oberoi, who has also kidnapped Meera. He drops both Maya and Meera from the top of the refinery. Spider-Man dives for his aunt, but fails to rescue Meera, who is saved by Doctor Octopus. Pavitr reveals his identity to Meera and asks her to take his aunt to safety.

Oberoi gets rid of Doctor Octopus for good and touches Spider-Man with the amulet. A Venom-like creature emerges from the amulet and tries to lure Spider-Man to the dark side. Pavitr remembers his uncle's saying about responsibility and rejects the evil. By doing so, the link between the demons and Oberoi is shattered, and he becomes human again. Spider-Man throws the amulet into the ocean, and Oberoi is sent to a mental institution.

Peace is restored to Mumbai eventually. Pavitr Prabhakar begins a romance with Meera, and is shown celebrating the festival Diwali with his aunt. The story ends with a quote from the Bhagavad Gita, showing the Venom-Demon still alive.

Parallels with Western Spider-Man
Spider-Man's alter ego in the comic is named Pavitr Prabhakar, a phonetic distortion of Peter Parker. There are a number of other parallels with the original comic book characters:

 Meera Jain – analogous to Mary Jane Watson
 Auntie Maya – analogous to Aunt May
 Uncle Bhim – analogous to Uncle Ben
 Nalin Oberoi – a local crime boss analogous to Norman Osborn who transforms into a demon reminiscent of the Ultimate Green Goblin
 Hari Oberoi – analogous to Harry Osborn; he does not appear in the comic, but is mentioned by Doctor Octopus
 Aadi – analogous to Eddie Brock/Venom
 Doctor Octopus – a mild-mannered doctor who Nalin Oberoi transforms into a demon with four magical tentacles

Later comic appearances
During the Spider-Verse storyline which featured Spider-Men from various alternate realities, Pavitr Prabhakar was seen fighting a mysterious new villain named Karn, whom he mistook for a demon. The Superior Spider-Man (Doctor Octopus' mind in Peter Parker's body) managed to save him and recruited him into his army of Spiders. In the second volume of Spider-Verse set during the Secret Wars event, Pavitr Prabhakar found himself in the domain of the Battleworld called Arachnia, where he teamed up with Spider-Gwen, Spider-Ham, Spider-Man Noir, Spider-UK and Anya Corazon, though none of them remembered their previous encounter during the original Spider-Verse.

Following the conclusion of Secret Wars the team of six Spiders that formed during the event will rename itself and feature in a new ongoing series called Web Warriors, a name that was coined by Peter Parker from the Ultimate Spider-Man TV series during the original Spider-Verse.

In other media

Film
 Pavitr Prabhakar / Spider-Man will appear in the upcoming film Spider-Man: Across the Spider-Verse, voiced by Karan Soni, as a member of Miguel O'Hara's Spider-Forces.

Video game
Pavitr Prabhakar / Spider-Man is playable among other Spiders (Spider-People) in the video game Spider-Man Unlimited.

References

External links

 Spider-Man: India at Marvel Wiki
 "Spider-Man, Swinging Through India". NPR. 6 January 2005
 Overdorf, Jason. "A MULTICULTURAL WEB". Newsweek. 25 July 2004. Retrieved 21 April 2022
 Sandhu, Sukhdev. "World Wide Web". New York Magazine 21 May 2005 
 "Spider-Man gets Indian make-over". BBC News. 24 June 2004

Spider-Man titles
Indian comics